The Buffalo Fork is a river that begins in the Teton Wilderness of Bridger-Teton National Forest in the U.S. state of Wyoming. The river has a north and south branch, both of which begin immediately west of the Continental Divide. Buffalo Fork travels southwest into Grand Teton National Park and empties into the Snake River adjacent to  Moran, Wyoming.

References 

Rivers of Wyoming
Rivers of Teton County, Wyoming